Miloš Samolov (born 31 March 1974) is a Serbian actor. He made his acting debut in the 2002 film Mala noćna muzika in 2002, and has since garnered notable lead and supporting roles in Serbian film, television and theatre. His notable film credits include lead roles in S.O.S. - Save Our Souls (2007), Wait for Me and I Will Not Come (2009), The Belgrade Phantom (2009), The Parade (2011) and Death of a Man in the Balkans (2012).  He has received widespread critical acclaim and popularity for his role as Sima in the Serbian television show Komšije. For his work in theatre, he received two Zoran Radmilović Awards, an Emperor Constantine Award and a Serbian Oscar of Popularity.

Selected filmography

References

External links 

1974 births
Living people
Male actors from Belgrade
Serbian male film actors
Serbian male television actors
Serbian male stage actors
Serbian male voice actors
Zoran Radmilović Award winners